Ephemeropsis is a genus of mosses belonging to the family Hookeriaceae.

The species of this genus are found in Australasia.

Species:
 Ephemeropsis tjibodensis Goebel, 1892 
 Ephemeropsis trentepohlioides Sainsbury, 1951

References

Hookeriales
Moss genera